The Southern Museum of Civil War and Locomotive History is a museum in Kennesaw, Georgia, that contains a collection of artifacts and relics from the American Civil War, as well as from railroads of the state of Georgia and surrounding regions. The centerpiece is the General, a steam locomotive used in the Great Locomotive Chase in April 1862.

The Archives house a significant collection of company records, engineering drawings, blueprints, glass plate negatives, photographs and correspondence from various American businesses representing the railroad industry in the South after the Civil War. The Archives also contain a growing collection of Civil War letters, diaries, and official records.

History and evolution

The museum (then known as the Big Shanty Museum), in a barn that once housed a cotton gin, initially opened on April 12, 1972, appropriately on the very date which the chase occurred one hundred and ten years prior, with the General as the centerpiece.  Later, the theme expanded to include Civil War pieces as well.

In the mid- to late 1990, the property of the former Glover Machine Works was to be demolished.  The buildings on this site, having sat vacant for nearly 50 years, still contained records, locomotive parts, machinery for locomotive construction, and at least one complete locomotive, which had only seen a few months of active service before being repossessed.  Descendants of the Glover family, who had retained ownership of the firm and its collection, in turn donated the collection to the museum in 2001.

With the acquisition of the rather large collection of artifacts, the museum closed in late 2001 and began a massive expansion to house them.  During the construction, a large "box" of plywood boards was built overtop of the General to protect it.  The augmented museum reopened in March 2003 as the Southern Museum of Civil War and Locomotive History.  A further expansion was finished in 2007 to house the recently acquired French Merci Boxcar.

External links
 Southern Museum of Civil War and Locomotive History
 Fansite devoted to the General (includes photos of the 2001-2003 construction).
 Site devoted to the Merci Boxcars given to the US, such as the Southern Museum's car.
 360 degree Panoramic photos of the Southern Museum
 1916 Glover Machine Works Locomotive historical marker
 HawkinsRails' Southern Museum of Civil War & Locomotive History collection

Railroad museums in Georgia (U.S. state)
Museums in Cobb County, Georgia
American Civil War museums in Georgia (U.S. state)
Kennesaw, Georgia
Museums established in 1972
1972 establishments in Georgia (U.S. state)
Smithsonian Institution affiliates
Great Locomotive Chase